This is a list of active stock exchanges in the Commonwealth of Nations (Full Members).  The Commonwealth of Nations features member-states located on all major continents and represents almost one-third of the Earth's population.  Some states have signed agreements establishing multi-state regional stock exchanges while other larger states may hold more than one, or even specialised stock exchanges. Among the list include the conceptualized Commonwealth free trade area, and nations which make up the proposed CANZUK-bloc.

Regulators 
 Financial regulation
 Securities Commission
 Securities exchange
 List of financial regulatory authorities by country
 Regulation D (SEC)

See also 
 List of stock exchanges in the United Kingdom, the British Crown Dependencies and United Kingdom Overseas Territories
 List of Commonwealth of Nations countries by GDP
 Sustainable Stock Exchanges Initiative
 List of stock market indices
 List of stock exchanges in Africa
 List of stock exchanges in the Americas
 List of South Asian stock exchanges
 List of Southeast Asian stock exchanges
 List of stock exchanges in Europe
 List of stock exchanges in Oceania
 List of stock exchanges in Western Asia
 List of countries without a stock exchange

References

Commonwealth of Nations
Stock exchanges